The 2019 season is Johor Darul Ta'zim Football Club's 46th season in club history and 7th season in the Malaysia Super League after rebranding their name from Johor FC.

Background

Johor Darul Ta'zim FC won their 2018 Malaysia Super League to become the first Malaysian club to win the league titles for five consecutive seasons (2014–2018).

JDT still holds an unbeaten home ground in Super League after extending the record up to 81 matches from 3 July 2012 (won against Sabah FA by 2–1) until 28 July 2018 which last action they won against Kuala Lumpur FA by 2–0).

JDT failed to qualify for next round in Malaysia FA Cup after  lost to Pahang FA with aggregate 0–3 on 20 April 2018.

JDT failed to defense their Malaysia Cup as reigning champion after defeated by Terengganu FC I with aggregate 2-3 which played on 20 October 2018 at Larkin.

In Asia, JDT failed to qualify for Semi-Final ASEAN zonal after being eliminated in the group stage even though they winning against Vietnamese club - Sông Lam Nghệ An on 24 April 2018.

Squad

Friendly matches

Thailand Pre-season Tour 2019

Competitions

Overview

Malaysia Super League

Table

Results summary

Malaysia Super League fixtures and results

Malaysia FA Cup

Malaysia Cup

Group B

Bracket

AFC Champions League

Table

Group stage

Club Statistics

Appearances
Correct as of match played on 13 July 2019

Top scorers

Top assists

Discipline

Transfers and contracts

In

Note 1: Harry Novillo returned to the team after the loan and subsequently leave the club after his contract ended.

Note 2: R.Gopinathan returned to Melaka United after the loan and on free transfer.

Note 3: S. Chanturu joined Felda United after returning from loan.

Note 4: Mahali Jasuli rejoins PKNS FC for another loan arrangement.

Note 5: Junior Eldstål retires from football in 2019. 

Note 6: Aarón Ñíguez was released before the 1st transfer window closed.

Out

Retained

References 

Johor Darul Ta'zim F.C.